Vita-Man is a fictional superhero published by Big Bang Comics. He first appears in Big Bang Comics #1, and was created by Gary Carlson and Mark Lewis. He is based on Hourman.

Publication history
Vita-Man  first appears on the back cover of Big Bang #0 starring in the fictional Red Hot Comics #14. After numerous reader requests to see Vita-Man in action, he finally gets his own story in Big Bang Comics #27.

Fictional character biography
Vita-Man is research scientist Will Wheeler, who discovered a new vitamin that gave him superpowers, which he named "Panacea Pills", the name given to the vitamins after his father created them. With this, he became the superhero Vita-Man (a play on the word vitamin), and later joined the Knights of Justice alongside Ultiman, Venus and Dr. Stellar.

Powers and abilities
The three Panacea Pills that give Vita-Man his powers empower him with super strength, constitution and speed.

External links
International Heroes: Vita-Man

Big Bang Comics
Fictional scientists in comics
Image Comics characters who can move at superhuman speeds
Image Comics characters with superhuman strength
Image Comics male superheroes